Bluegrass Album, Vol. 4 is a fourth album by bluegrass supergroup, Bluegrass Album Band, released in 1984.

Track listing 
 "Age" (Jim Croce) 3:25
 "Cheyenne" (Bobby Hicks, Bill Monroe) 3:24
 "Cora Is Gone" (Odell McLeod) 3:05
 "Old Home Town" (Lester Flatt) 3:00)
 "Talk It Over With Him" (T.C. Neal) 3:05
 "Head Over Heels" (Lester Flatt) 2:33
 "Nobody Loves Me" (Zeke Clements) 2:55
 "When You Are Lonely" (Lester Flatt, Bill Monroe) 2:35
 "I Might Take You Back Again" (Josh Graves, Leroy Mack) 1:50
 "Lonesome Wind Blues" (Wayne Raney) 3:07
 "Somehow Tonight" (Earl Scruggs) 3:02

Personnel
 Tony Rice - guitar, vocals
 J.D. Crowe - banjo, vocals
 Doyle Lawson - mandolin, vocals
 Bobby Hicks - fiddle
 Jerry Douglas - Dobro, vocals
 Todd Philips - bass

References

1984 albums
Rounder Records albums